Leslie may refer to:
 Leslie (name), a name and list of people with the given name or surname, including fictional characters

Families
 Clan Leslie, a Scottish clan with the motto "grip fast"
 Leslie (Russian nobility), a Russian noble family of Scottish origin

Places

Canada 
 Leslie, Saskatchewan
 Leslie Street, a road in Toronto and York Region, Ontario
 Leslie (TTC), a subway station
 Leslie Street Spit, an artificial spit in Toronto

United States 
Leslie, Arkansas
Leslie, Georgia
Leslie, Michigan
Leslie, Missouri
Leslie, West Virginia
Leslie, Wisconsin
Leslie Township, Michigan
Leslie Township, Minnesota

Elsewhere 
 Leslie Dam, a dam in Warwick, Queensland, Australia
 Leslie, Mpumalanga, South Africa
 Leslie, Aberdeenshire, Scotland, see List of listed buildings in Leslie, Aberdeenshire
 Leslie, Fife, Scotland, UK

Other uses
 Leslie speaker system
 Leslie Motor Car company
 Leslie Controls, Inc.
 Leslie (singer) (born 1985), French singer

See also 
 
 Lesley (disambiguation)
 Tropical Storm Leslie, a list of tropical storms